The National University of Entre Ríos (UNER) is an Argentine national university situated in the city of Concepción del Uruguay, Entre Ríos.

See also
List of Argentine universities
Science and Education in Argentina
Argentine Higher Education Official Site 
Argentine Universities

References

External links

1973 establishments in Argentina
Entre Rios
Educational institutions established in 1973
Universities in Entre Ríos Province